A Serpentine Dance was an 1896 French silent film directed by Georges Méliès. It was released by Méliès's company Star Film and is numbered 44 in its catalogues. The film is currently presumed lost.

References

External links 
 

1896 films
French black-and-white films
French short documentary films
French silent short films
Films directed by Georges Méliès
Lost French films
1890s dance films
French dance films
1890s short documentary films
1890s lost films
1890s French films